David Wilson (born 7 September 1951) is a British hurdler. He competed in the men's 110 metres hurdles at the 1972 Summer Olympics.

References

1951 births
Living people
Athletes (track and field) at the 1972 Summer Olympics
British male hurdlers
Olympic athletes of Great Britain
Place of birth missing (living people)
Sportspeople from Edinburgh